On July 21, 1865 Harvard University held a Commemoration Day as part of that year's Commencement Week, to celebrate the end of the American Civil War and honor the Harvard alumni who had served and died in it.

A "Commemoration Ode" delivered as part of the ceremonies by James Russell Lowell was widely reprinted.

Sources
As the Civil War finally ends, a relieved, sad, graduation day
Harvard's Commemoration Day July 21, 1865 on JSTOR
Introduction § Harvard University Archives Research Guide: Harvard and the Military
The Cambridge Chronicle 26 August 1865 — Cambridge Public Library's Historic Cambridge Newspaper Collection
Ode Recited at the Harvard Commemoration, July 21, 1865

External links
James Russell Lowell's Ode

Harvard University
American Civil War